Ganga Yamuna is a 1997 Indian Kannada-language romance drama film directed by S. Mahendar and produced by Ghouse Peer. The film stars Shiva Rajkumar, Malashri and newcomer Ravinder Maan. Actress Suhasini Maniratnam featured in a cameo role. The movie is a remake of 1994 Telugu movie Subhalagnam.

Cast 

 Shiva Rajkumar 
 Malashri
 Ravinder Mann
 Mukhyamantri Chandru
 Shobharaj
 Doddanna
 Sadhu Kokila
 Rekha Das
 Girija Lokesh
 Honnavalli Krishna
 Suhasini in a guest appearance

Soundtrack 
The soundtrack of the film was composed by Vidyasagar. The song "Olave Mounava" was reused from his own composition "Malare Mounama" from the Tamil film Karnaa (1995) while the other song "Priya Ninna Neeli" was reused from the Hindi film Damini.

References

External links 

1997 films
1990s Kannada-language films
Indian drama films
Films scored by Vidyasagar
Films directed by S. Mahendar
1997 drama films
Kannada remakes of Telugu films